Yenikənd (also, Yenikend) is a village in the Agdash Rayon of Azerbaijan. The village forms part of the municipality of Aşağı Nemətabad.

References 

Populated places in Agdash District